The 1973 LFF Lyga was the 52nd season of the LFF Lyga football competition in Lithuania.  It was contested by 26 teams, and Nevezis Kedainiai won the championship.

Group Zalgiris

Group Nemunas

Final

Playoff
Nevezis Kedainiai 3-0 Granitas Klaipėda

References
RSSSF

LFF Lyga seasons
1973 in Lithuania
LFF